The 1923 Rutland and Stamford by-election was held on 30 October 1923.  The by-election was held due to the death of the incumbent Conservative MP, Charles Harvey Dixon.  It was won by the Conservative candidate Neville Smith-Carington.

References

1923 in England
Politics of Rutland
1923 elections in the United Kingdom
By-elections to the Parliament of the United Kingdom in East Midlands constituencies
By-elections to the Parliament of the United Kingdom in Lincolnshire constituencies
20th century in Rutland
20th century in Lincolnshire